Sir Ernest Arthur Jelf MA (1868–1949), eldest son of Arthur Richard Jelf, was King's Remembrancer from 1937 to 1943 and author of Where to Find Your Law. He was knighted in 1939.

He edited the third edition of Encyclopaedia of the Laws of England.

References

Sources
"Jelf, Sir Ernest Arthur", Who Was Who, A & C Black, an imprint of Bloomsbury Publishing plc, 1920–2015; online edition, Oxford University Press, April 2014.
Lawrence, Martell and Pine. "Jelf, Sir Ernest Arthur" in Who Was Who among English and European Authors, 1931-1949. Gale Research. 1978. Page 763.
(1949) 99 The Law Journal 491 Google Books
"Obituary" (1949) 208 The Law Times and Journal of Property 160 Google Books
(1949) 68 Law Notes 225 Google Books
The Solicitor (14 October 1949) Vols 16-17, p 217 Google Books 
"Obituary" (1949) 113 Justice of the Peace and Local Government Review 579 Google Books
"Sir Ernest Jelf" (1949) 93 Solicitors Journal 567 Google Books
(1949) 65 Scottish Law Review and Sheriff Court Reports 251 Google Books
Howard and Crisp. Visitation of Ireland. 1904. Volume 4. Page 100.
Marke, J J. A Catalogue of the Law Collection at New York University. New York University Law Library. 1953. Page 958. 
19 Law Quarterly Review 551
57 Law Quarterly Review 552

1868 births
1949 deaths
Members of the Inner Temple
Masters of the High Court (England and Wales)
Knights Bachelor
British legal writers